Todd Goudy is a Canadian politician, who was elected to the Legislative Assembly of Saskatchewan in a by-election on March 1, 2018. He represents the electoral district of Melfort as a member of the Saskatchewan Party. He was appointed Provincial Secretary responsible for francophone affairs on August 13, 2019.

References

Living people
Saskatchewan Party MLAs
21st-century Canadian politicians
Year of birth missing (living people)